Nemonte Nenquimo is an Indigenous activist and member of the Waorani Nation from the Amazonian Region of Ecuador. She is the first female president of the Waorani of Pastaza (CONCONAWEP) and co-founder of the Indigenous-led nonprofit organization Ceibo Alliance. In 2020, she was named in the Time 100 list of the 100 most influential people in the world, the only Indigenous woman on the list and the second Ecuadorian to ever be named in its history. In recognition of her work, in 2020 the United Nations Environment Programme gave her the "Champions of the Earth" award in the category Inspiration and Action.

Nenquimo was the plaintiff in a lawsuit against the Ecuadorian government, which culminated in a 2019 ruling that protects half a million acres of Waorani ancestral land in the Amazon rainforest from oil drilling.

Early life and career 
Nenquimo was born in the community of Nemompare in 1985 in the Pastaza region of the Ecuadorian Amazon. She is a member of the Waorani Nation of hunter-harvesters.

In 2015, Nenquimo co-founded Ceibo Alliance, an Indigenous-led nonprofit to protect Indigenous lands from resource extraction. She was elected the first female president of the Waorani organization of Pastaza province (CONCONAWEP) in 2018.

Activism 
Nenquimo has expressed a love for her land going back generations. Her community, the Waorani Nation, were first colonized in 1958 by Christian missionaries.  Soon after in the 1960s, the Ecuadorian government, driven by oil, began building roads and destroying their forest.  The government has also divided Waorani land to be auctioned for oil extraction.  Most of the Ecuadorian Amazon has been affected by this, with six of the blocks auctioned to oil companies belonging to the Waorani.  One of these blocks is Nemompare, Nenquimo’s birthplace.  As a result, the Waorani people have been forced to moved further into the forest in a fight to remain independent from the outside world.

Nemonte Nenquimo says that her people have felt the effects of climate change long before it became a mainstream conversation.  She has also stated that abuelas (elderly Waorani women) have provided her with the knowledge and passion to fight for change.

2019 court ruling 

The Ecuadorian Amazon Rainforest is home to many indigenous people. Many often claim that their rights, access to their land, and ability to make decisions has been ignored by the government. As a result, as part of CONCONAWEP (Coordinating Council of the Waorani Nationality of Ecuador-Pastaza), Nenquimo co-filed a lawsuit with Ecuador’s human rights ombudsmen against the Ecuadorian government. Nenquimo was the plaintiff in the lawsuit, whose 2019 ruling by a three-judge panel of the Pastaza Provincial Court protects half a million acres of the Amazon rainforest in Ecuador from oil drilling. The verdict that the Ecuadorian government must engage in the free, prior and informed consent process according to the standards of international law and the Constitutional Court of Ecuador before auctioning land provides a legal precedent for other Indigenous nations to counteract resource extraction within Indigenous territory.

A parade of hundreds of Waorani people celebrated the ruling in April 2019 in Puyo, the regional capital of the eastern province of Pastaza. Many traveled great distances to attend.

Current work 
Nemonte Nenquimo, along with her husband Mitch Anderson (founder of Amazon Frontlines) is set to publish a book We Will Not Be Saved in March 2023. In this memoir, she confronts the racist perceptions of Indigenous people with a dive into oral history to demonstrate not only her life story but also that of the Amazon.

Awards
In 2020, she was featured on the Time 100 list, the only Indigenous woman that year and among the first Amazonians ever to be named. She was also on the list of the BBC's 100 Women announced on 23 November 2020. In 2020, Nenquimo was one of six environmental leaders to be awarded the Goldman Environmental Prize.

References 

1985 births
Huaorani people
Living people
Women environmentalists
Goldman Environmental Prize awardees
People from Pastaza Province
Indigenous rights activists
Indigenous women of the Americas
Ecuadorian environmentalists
Indigenous activists of the Americas
Indigenous peoples and the environment
BBC 100 Women
21st-century Ecuadorian women